Sherwood is a surname, and may refer to:

Adrian Sherwood (born 1958), English record producer
Alf Sherwood, Welsh footballer
Andrew Sherwood (born 1980), American politician
Arthur Percy Sherwood (1854–1940), Canadian Commissioner of Police
Ben Sherwood (born 1964), American writer, journalist and producer
Bill Sherwood (1952–1990), American musician, screenwriter and film director
Billy Sherwood (born 1965), American musician and two-time and current  member of the band Yes
Bobby Sherwood (1914–1981), American bandleader and composer
Brad Sherwood (born 1964), American actor
Brandi Sherwood (born 1971), former Miss USA and Miss Teen USA and a model on The Price is Right
Carlton Sherwood (1946–2014), American journalist
Charles D. Sherwood (1833–1895), American politician
Cyril Sherwood (1915–1996), Canadian politician and farmer
Davetta Sherwood (born 1984), American actress and musician
David Sherwood (born 1980), British tennis coach and former player
Don Sherwood (politician) (born 1941), American politician
Don Sherwood (cartoonist) (1930–2010), American cartoonist and illustrator
Franklin D. Sherwood (1841–1907), American politician and member of the New York State Senate
Gale Sherwood (1929–2017), Canadian singer and actress
George Sherwood (disambiguation), multiple people
Grace Sherwood (1660–1740), last known person convicted of witchcraft in Colonial Virginia
Henry Sherwood (disambiguation), multiple people
Holly Sherwood, singer who performed mostly in the 1980s with Jim Steinman
Isaac R. Sherwood (1835–1925), American politician and newspaper editor
James Sherwood (born 1933), American businessman
Jamien Sherwood (born 2000), American football player
Jim Sherwood (1942–2011), American rock musician
John Sherwood (disambiguation), multiple people
Kate Brownlee Sherwood (1841–1914), American poet, journalist, translator
Katherine Sherwood (born 1952), American artist
Leonid Sherwood (1871–1954), Russian sculptor and architect
Levi Sherwood (born 1991), New Zealand freestyle motocross
Levius Peters Sherwood (1777–1850), lawyer, judge and politician in Upper Canada
Lyman Sherwood (1802–1865), New York politician
Madeleine Sherwood (1922–2016), Canadian actress
Margaret Pollock Sherwood (1864–1955), American novelist and short-story writer
Mary Sherwood (1856–1935), American physician and public health advocate
Mary Elizabeth Wilson Sherwood (1830–1903), American author and socialite
Mary Martha Sherwood (1775–1851), English writer of children's literature
Michael Sherwood, American musician and singer
Michael Sherwood (banker) (born 1965), British banker, vice-chairman of Goldman Sachs
Milton Sherwood (born 1939), Canadian former politician
Oliver Sherwood (born 1955), English racehorse trainer
Percy Sherwood (1866–1939), German-born composer and pianist of English nationality
Peter M. A. Sherwood, American professor
Phyllis Sherwood (1937–2007), Playboy Playmate of the Month for August 1963
Raymond Sherwood (1899–1965), American lyricist
Robert Edmund Sherwood (1864–1946), American clown and author
Robert E. Sherwood (1896–1955), American playwright, editor, and screenwriter
Samuel Sherwood (disambiguation), multiple people
Sheila Sherwood (born 1945), British retired long jumper
Shirley Sherwood (born 1933), collector and author of books about botanical illustrations
Thomas Sherwood (disambiguation), multiple people
Tim Sherwood (born 1969), English footballer manager and international footballer
Vladimir Osipovich Sherwood (1832-1897), Russian architect
Vladimir Vladimirovich Sherwood (1867-1930), Russian architect
Will Sherwood (1871–1955), British trade unionist and politician
Winfield S. Sherwood (1817–1870), American politician

See also
John Sherwood-Kelly (1880–1931), South African recipient of the Victoria Cross

English-language surnames